Ruthenian and Ruthene are exonyms of Latin origin, formerly used in Eastern and Central Europe as common ethnonyms for East Slavs, particularly during the late medieval and early modern periods. The Latin term Rutheni was used in medieval sources to describe all Eastern Slavs of the Grand Duchy of Lithuania, as an exonym for people of the former Kievan Rus', thus including ancestors of the modern Russians, Ukrainians and Belarusians. The use of Ruthenian and related exonyms continued through the early modern period, developing several distinctive meanings, both in terms of their regional scopes and additional religious connotations (such as affiliation with the Ruthenian Greek Catholic Church).

In medieval sources, the Latin term Rutheni was commonly applied to East Slavs in general, thus encompassing all endonyms and their various forms (Ukrainian: русини, Belarusian: русіны). By opting for the use of exonymic terms, authors who wrote in Latin were relieved from the need to be specific in their applications of those terms, and the same quality of Ruthenian exonyms is often recognized in modern, mainly Western authors, particularly those who prefer to use exonyms (foreign in origin) over endonyms.

During the early modern period, the exonym Ruthenian was most frequently applied to the East Slavic population of the Polish–Lithuanian Commonwealth, an area encompassing territories of modern Ukraine and Belarus from the 15th up to the 18th centuries. In the former Austro-Hungarian Monarchy, the same term was employed (up to 1918) as an official exonym for the entire East Slavic population within the borders of the Monarchy.

History

Ruteni, a misnomer that was also the name of an extinct and unrelated Celtic tribe in Ancient Gaul, was used in reference to Rus' in the Annales Augustani of 1089. An alternative early modern Latinisation, Rucenus (plural Ruceni) was, according to Boris Unbegaun, derived from Rusyn. Baron Herberstein, describing the land of Russia, inhabited by the Rutheni who call themselves Russi, claimed that the first of the governors who rule Russia is the Grand Duke of Moscow, the second is the Grand Duke of Lithuania and the third is the King of Poland.

According to professor John-Paul Himka from the University of Alberta the word Rutheni did not include the modern Russians, who were known as Moscovitae. Vasili III of Russia, who ruled the Grand Duchy of Moscow in the 16th century, was known in European Latin sources as Rhuteni Imperator. Jacques Margeret in his book "Estat de l'empire de Russie, et grande duché de Moscovie" of 1607 explained that the name "Muscovites" for the population of Tsardom (Empire) of Russia is an error. During conversations, they called themselves rusaki (which is a colloquial term for Russians) and only the citizens of the capital called themself "Muscovites". Margeret considered that this error is worse than calling all the French "Parisians".  Professor David Frick from the Harvard Ukrainian Research Institute has also found in Vilnius the documents from 1655, which demonstrate that Moscovitae were also known in Lithuania as Rutheni. The 16th century Portuguese poet Luís Vaz de Camões in his Os Lusíadas" (Canto III, 11) clearly writes "...Entre este mar e o Tánais vive estranha Gente: Rutenos, Moscos e Livónios, Sármatas outro tempo..." differentiating between Ruthenians and Muscovites.

 
After the partition of Poland the term Ruthenian referred exclusively to people of the Rusyn- and Ukrainian-speaking areas of the Austro-Hungarian Empire, especially in the Kingdom of Galicia and Lodomeria, Bukovina, and Transcarpathia.

At the request of Mykhajlo Levitsky, in 1843 the term Ruthenian became the official name for the Rusyns and Ukrainians within the Austrian Empire. For example, Ivan Franko and Stepan Bandera in their passports were identified as Ruthenians. By 1900 more and more Ruthenians began to call themselves with the self-designated name Ukrainians. A number of Ukrainian members of the intelligentsia, such as Mykhailo Drahomanov and Ivan Franko, perceived the term as narrow-minded, provincial and Habsburg.  With the emergence of Ukrainian nationalism during the mid-19th century, use of "Ruthenian" and cognate terms declined among Ukrainians and fell out of use in Eastern and Central Ukraine. Most people in the western region of Ukraine followed suit later in the 19th century. During the early 20th century, the name Ukrajins’ka mova ("Ukrainian language") became accepted by much of the Ukrainian-speaking literary class in the Austro-Hungarian Kingdom of Galicia and Lodomeria. 

Following the dissolution of the Austro-Hungarian Empire in 1918, new states emerged and dissolved; borders changed frequently. After several years the Rusyn and Ukrainian speaking areas of eastern Austria-Hungary found themselves divided between the Ukrainian Soviet Republic, Czechoslovakia, Poland, and Romania.

When commenting on the partition of Czechoslovakia by Nazi Germany in March 1939, US diplomat George Kennan noted, "To those who inquire whether these peasants are Russians or Ukrainians, there is only one answer. They are Neither. They are simply Ruthenians."  Dr. Paul R. Magocsi emphasizes that modern Ruthenians have "the sense of a nationality distinct from Ukrainians" and often associate Ukrainians with Soviets or Communists.

After the expansion of Soviet Ukraine following World War II, several groups who had not previously considered themselves Ukrainians were merged into the Ukrainian identity.

Ruthenian terminology in Poland

In the Interbellum period of the 20th century, the term rusyn (Ruthenian) was also applied to people from the Kresy Wschodnie (the eastern borderlands) in the Second Polish Republic, and included Ukrainians, Rusyns, and Lemkos, or alternatively, members of the Uniate or Greek Catholic Church churches. In Galicia, the Polish government actively replaced all references to "Ukrainians" with the old word rusini ("Ruthenians").

The Polish census of 1921 considered Ukrainians no other than Ruthenians. However the Polish census of 1931 counted Belarusian, Ukrainian, Russian, and Ruthenian as separate language categories, and the census results were substantially different from before. According to Rusyn-American historian Paul Robert Magocsi, Polish government policy in the 1930s pursued a strategy of tribalization, regarding various ethnographic groups—i.e., Lemkos, Boykos, and Hutsuls, as well Old Ruthenians and Russophiles—as different from other Ukrainians (although no such category existed in the Polish census apart from the first-language speakers of Russian), and offered instructions in Lemko vernacular in state schools set up in the westernmost Lemko Region.

The Polish census of 1931 listed "Russian", "Ruthenian" and "Ukrainian" (Polish: rosyjski, ruski, ukraiński, respectively) as separate languages.

Carpatho-Ruthenian Ethnonyms

By the end of the 19th century, another set of terms came into use in several western languages, combining regional Carpathian with Ruthenian designations, and thus producing composite terms such as: Carpatho-Ruthenes or Carpatho-Ruthenians. Those terms also acquired several meanings, depending on the shifting geographical scopes of the term Carpathian Ruthenia. Those meanings were also spanning from wider uses as designations for all East Slavs of the Carpathian region, to narrower uses, focusing on those local groups of East Slavs who did not accept modern Russian or Ukrainian identities, but rather opted to keep their traditional Rusyn identity. 
 
The designations Rusyn and Carpatho-Rusyn were banned in the Soviet Union by the end of World War II in June 1945. Ruthenians who identified under the Rusyn ethnonym and considered themselves to be a national and linguistic group separate from Ukrainians and Belarusians were relegated to the Carpathian diaspora and formally functioned among the large immigrant communities in the United States. A cross-European revival took place only with the collapse of communist rule in 1989. This has resulted in political conflict and accusations of intrigue against Rusyn activists, including criminal charges. The Rusyn minority is well represented in Slovakia. The single category of people who listed their ethnicity as Rusyn was created in the 1920s, however, no generally accepted standardised Rusyn language existed.

The government of Slovakia has proclaimed Rusyns (Rusíni) to be a distinct national minority (1991) and recognised Rusyn language as a distinct language (1995).

Speculative theories 

Since the 19th century, several speculative theories emerged regarding the origin and nature of medieval and early modern uses of Ruthenian terms as designations for East Slavs. Some of those theories were focused on a very specific source, a memorial plate from 1521, that was placed in the catacombe Chapel of St Maximus in Petersfriedhof, the burial site of St Peter's Abbey in Salzburg (modern Austria). The plate contains Latin inscription that mentions Italian ruler Odoacer (476-493) as king of "Rhutenes" or "Rhutenians", and narrates a story about the martyrdom of St Maximus during an invasion of several peoples into Noricum in 477. Due to the very late date (1521) and several anachronistic elements, the content of that plate is considered as legendary.

In spite of that, some authors (mainly non-scholars) employed that plate as a "source" for several theories that were trying to connect Odoacer with ancient Celtic Ruthenes from Gaul, thus also providing an apparent bridge towards later medieval authors who labeled East Slavs as Ruthenes or Ruthenians. On those bases, an entire strain of speculative theories was created, regarding the alleged connection between ancient Gallic Ruthenes and later East Slavic "Ruthenians". As noted by professor Paul R. Magocsi, those theories should be regarded as "inventive tales" of "creative" writers.

Geography

From the 9th century, the main Rus' state, which was known later as Kyivan Rus' – and is now part of the modern states of Ukraine, Belarus and Russia – was known in Western Europe by a variety of names derived from Rus'. From the 12th century, the land of Rus' was usually known in Western Europe by the Latinised name Ruthenia.

See also
 American Carpatho-Ruthenian Orthodox Diocese
 Coat of arms of Carpathian Ruthenia
 Names of Rus', Russia and Ruthenia
 Polish–Lithuanian–Ruthenian Commonwealth
 Ruthenian Greek Catholic Church
 Ruthenian nobility
 Ukrainian Greek Catholic Church
 Ukrainian Russophiles

References

Sources

  
 
 
  
 
  
 
 
  
 
 

 Nakonechny, Ye. УКРАДЕНЕ ІМ’Я чому русини стали українцями [Stolen Name: Why Ruthenians Became Ukrainians] . Stefanyk Science Library (National Academy of Sciences of Ukraine). Lviv, 2001.

External links

 
 
 Carpatho-Rusyn Heritage - The Carpathian Connection

 
 
Exonyms
Grand Duchy of Lithuania
Ukrainian studies